Pteroceltis tatarinowii a species of tree endemic to China and the only extant member of the genus Pteroceltis. Common names include blue sandalwood, wingceltis or qing tan.

References

 Pteroceltis tatarinowii, Maximowicz, Bull. Acad. Imp. Sci. Saint-Pétersbourg. 18: 293. 1873.
 The Plant List entry
 eFloras entry

External links

Cannabaceae
Plants described in 1873
Trees of China
Endemic flora of China